In mathematics, a sparsely totient number is a certain kind of natural number.  A natural number, n, is sparsely totient if for all m > n,

where  is Euler's totient function.  The first few sparsely totient numbers are:

2, 6, 12, 18, 30, 42, 60, 66, 90, 120, 126, 150, 210, 240, 270, 330, 420, 462, 510, 630, 660, 690, 840, 870, 1050, 1260, 1320, 1470, 1680, 1890, 2310, 2730, 2940, 3150, 3570, 3990, 4620, 4830, 5460, 5610, 5670, 6090, 6930, 7140, 7350, 8190, 9240, 9660, 9870, ... .

The concept was introduced by David Masser and Peter Man-Kit Shiu in 1986. As they showed, every primorial is sparsely totient.

Properties
 If P(n) is the largest prime factor of n, then .
  holds for an exponent .
 It is conjectured that .

References

 
 

Integer sequences